In telecommunication, an isochronous signal is a signal in which the time interval separating any two significant instants is equal to the unit interval or a multiple of the unit interval. Variations in the time intervals are constrained within specified limits.

"Isochronous" is a characteristic of one signal, while "synchronous" indicates a relationship between two or more signals.

See also
 Synchronization in telecommunications
 Synchronous network
 Mesochronous network
 Plesiochronous system
 Asynchronous system

References

Telecommunications engineering
Synchronization